Mark James Dempsey (born 14 January 1964) is an English football coach and former player.

Dempsey was born in Crumpsall, Manchester. He played as a midfielder in The Football League for Manchester United, Swindon Town, Sheffield United, Chesterfield and Rotherham United, and in Non-League football for Macclesfield Town. He was a youth coach with Manchester United before moving to Norway. He has six children, two of them adopted.

Managerial career
In February 2009, he took up a post in youth development with Tromsø IL and the Northern Norway region. On 9 November 2010, Dempsey joined Molde as part of new manager Ole Gunnar Solskjær's backroom staff. He followed Solskjær to Cardiff City in January 2014 as part of a new-look backroom staff after the sacking of Malky Mackay.

Haugesund
In 2016, Dempsey was FK Haugesund's manager after taking over from Jostein Grindhaug after the 2015 season. Dempsey resigned as manager of Haugesund on 14 July 2016.

Djurgården
In August 2016, Dempsey became manager of Swedish top-flight side Djurgården.

Molde return
On 29 December 2016, Molde announced that Dempsey had returned to the club as an assistant manager, working alongside Erling Moe, on a -year contract.

Start
On 1 December 2017, Dempsey was appointed manager of Start
On 18 May 2018, Dempsey got sacked by Start due to poor results.

Kongsvinger
Dempsey was announced as the new manager of Norwegian 2nd tier club Kongsvinger on 11 June 2018.

Manchester United
Dempsey rejoined Manchester United after the departure of José Mourinho in December 2018 as part of caretaker manager Ole Gunnar Solskjær's coaching staff, taking on the role of a technical coach. In 2019 whilst Manchester United were on their pre-season tour of Australia Dempsey was struck ill and was admitted to hospital. He was subsequently off work for the next couple of months before returning to his role in December 2019.
In 2022 he was part of the coaching team that successfully guided Norway's U21s to qualifying for the European U21 finals in  Romania and Georgia, summer of 2023.

Managerial statistics

References

1964 births
Living people
People from Moston, Manchester
English footballers
Association football midfielders
Manchester United F.C. players
Swindon Town F.C. players
Sheffield United F.C. players
Chesterfield F.C. players
Rotherham United F.C. players
Macclesfield Town F.C. players
Manchester United F.C. non-playing staff
English Football League players
National League (English football) players
Tromsø IL non-playing staff
Molde FK non-playing staff
Cardiff City F.C. non-playing staff
English expatriate sportspeople in Norway
Expatriate football managers in Norway
FK Haugesund managers
Djurgårdens IF Fotboll managers
English expatriate sportspeople in Sweden
Expatriate football managers in Sweden
IK Start managers
Kongsvinger IL Toppfotball managers
English football managers
Eliteserien managers
Allsvenskan managers